Dr. Ravindra Nanda (born 19 February 1943) is a professor and Head of the Department of Craniofacial Sciences and Chair of the Division of Orthodontics at the  University of Connecticut School of Dental Medicine.
He is part of the founding faculty of School of Dental Medicine and has been at the University of Connecticut since 1972 where he also holds an Alumni Chair in the Orthodontics Division. He is an innovator of various appliances in orthodontics.His research and clinical interests include adolescent and adult orthodontics, the biology of tooth mobility, craniofacial orthopedics, biomechanics and developing efficient mechanics to deliver orthodontic care.

Personal life 
Dr. Nanda was born in Lyallpur, British India (presently Faisalabad, Pakistan) as the youngest of seven children but moved soon after the Partition of India. His father, a family physician, practiced for 30 years there. He has two brothers, Dr. Ram S. Nanda and Dr. Surender Nanda, who are orthodontists in the United States of America. Dr. Nanda did his Post Graduation in Orthodontics under his elder brother Dr. Ram S. Nanda, who was the head of department of orthodontics of King Georges Medical College, Lucknow University. He is married and current resides in Connecticut.

Education 
Dr. Ravindra Nanda received bachelor's and master's degrees in dentistry and orthodontics from King George's Medical College, Lucknow University. His thesis on "Cephalometric Study of the Dentofacial Complex of North Indians" was selected for the scholarship research grant from the Indian Council of Medical Research and was published in the January 1969 issue of the Angle Orthodontist. He joined Katholieke Universiteit, Nijmegen, the Netherlands in 1967 and received his PhD in Philosophy in 1969. Dr. Nanda came over to the new dental school at Loyola in Chicago in 1970, after serving as fellow and assistant professor in orthodontics with Frans van der Linden. In 1972, he advanced to the Department of Orthodontics, University of Connecticut in Farmington, CT, and received his certificate in orthodontics under Dr. Charles Burstone.

Career 

Nanda joined the University of Connecticut in 1972 after teaching two years at Loyola University in Maywood, IL. Over the last 39 years he moved from assistant professor to full professor in 1979. He assumed the position of Head of the Department of Orthodontics in 1992 and was promoted to lead the Department of Craniofacial Sciences in 2004, which include the divisions of Oral and Maxillofacial Surgery, Pediatric Dentistry, Advanced Education in General Dentistry, and Orthodontics.

Nanda is a member and past-president of the North Atlantic component of the Edward H. Angle Society of Orthodontists. Currently, Nanda is the editor-in-chief of Progress in Orthodontics, the associate editor of Journal of Clinical Orthodontics and on the editorial board of nine national and international orthodontic journals. He is a member of the American Dental Association, the Connecticut State Dental Association, the Hartford Dental Society, the American Association of Orthodontics, the European Orthodontic Society, the International Association of Dental Research, and the College of Diplomats of the American Board of Orthodontists He has authored and edited seven textbooks  and more than 200 publications and peer-reviewed journals. He has given keynote lectures in more than 40 countries and has received awards and honors from U.S and international orthodontic organizations. Most recently Dr. Nanda was honored with a Life Time Membership to the Indian Orthodontic Society (IOS), at the 8th APOC in New Delhi, India.

Awards and honors 
Dr. Ravindra Nanda has received numerous awards for his contributions in dentistry and orthodontics; the most notable include:
 Honorary Member - Jordan Orthodontic Society
 John Taylor Lecture, Australia - Australia Society of Orthodontics Foundation
 Sheldon Friel Memorial Lecture - European Orthodontic Society
 Keith Godfrey Visiting Professor, Sydney, Australia - University of Sydney
 Life Time Achievement Award - University of Connecticut Foundation
 John Mershon Memorial Lecture, Boston, Massachusetts - America Association of Orthodontics
 Honorary Member - Czech Orthodontic Society 
 Honorary Member - Taiwanese Orthodontic Society 
 Honorary Life Time Membership - Indian Orthodontic Society 
 Gordon Kirkness Memorial Lecture - Australian Society of Orthodontics 
 Honorary Member - Central American Orthodontics Society 
 Wendell L. Wylie Memorial Lecture, San Francisco, California - University of San Francisco 
 Senior Research Fellow, Japan Promotion for Science, Sendai, Japan - Tohoku University

Publications

Textbooks 
 Nanda, R and Burstone, CJ (eds) Retention and Stability in Orthodontics WB Saunders Co, Philadelphia, PA, 1993.
 Nanda, R Biomechanics in Clinical Orthodontics WB Saunders Co, Philadelphia, PA, 1996.
 Nanda,R Biomechanic and Esthetic Strategies in Clinical Orthodontics. WB Saunders Co, Philadelphia, PA 2005.
 Nanda R. Temporary Anchorage Devices in Orthodontics. Philadelphia: WB Saunders, 2008.
 Nanda R. and Kapila, S. Current Therapy in Orthodontics, Mosby, St. Louis, April, 2009.
 Nanda R. Esthetics and Biomechanics in Orthodontics, Saunders, St. Louis, MO, 2015.
 Nanda R, Uribe, F. Atlas of Complex Orthodontics, Elsevier, St. Louis, MO, 2016.

Monographs and Invited Editorships 
 Nanda, R The normal palate and induced cleft palate in rat embryos: An in vivo in vitro and autoradiographic study on embryological development. Gebr Janssen, Nymegen, The Netherlands, Monograph pp 1–120, 1969.
 Nanda, R (ed) Symposium in Orthodontics, Dental Clinics of North America WB Saunders Co, Philadelphia, PA, 1981. (Translation in Japanese, Spanish, Italian, German and Greek).
 Nanda, R (ed) Management of Complex Orthodontic Problems. Seminars in Orthodontics WB Saunders Co, Philadelphia, PA, 1996.
 Nanda, R (ed) Adult Orthodontics. Dental Clinics of North America, Volume 1. WB Saunders Co, Philadelphia, PA, 40:11, 811-1016, 1996.
 Nanda, R (ed) Adult Orthodontics. Dental Clinics of North America, Volume 11. WB Saunders Co, Philadelphia, PA, 41:1-154, 1997.
 Nanda, R (guest editor) Infromationau aus Orthodontie and Kieferorthopadie 30:30, 1998.

References 

1943 births
University of Connecticut faculty
Orthodontists
Living people
King George's Medical University alumni
University of Lucknow alumni